1987 in the Philippines details events of note that happened in the Philippines in the year 1987.

Incumbents

President: Corazon Aquino (PDP-Laban)
Vice President: Salvador Laurel (UNIDO)
Chief Justice: Claudio Teehankee (1986–88)
 Philippine Congress: 8th Congress of the Philippines
 Senate President: Jovito Salonga (Liberal)
 House Speaker: Ramon V. Mitra, Jr. (LDP, 2nd District Palawan)

Events

January
 January 4 – A government proposal for autonomy in 4 Muslim-dominated provinces in Mindanao is agreed by Muslim separatists, ending the 14-year secessionist war in the area.
 January 22 – A crowd of 10,000, mostly farmers demanding land reforms (and rallying against Pres. Aquino), are shot by the troops at Mendiola Bridge during their protest march as they are going to the presidential palace in Manila; 13 farmers killed; 98 others injured.
 January 27 – Pro-Marcos rebel soldiers, led by Col. Oscar Canlas, occupy GMA Network compound, wherein a siege by some 300 mutineers for almost 3 days ends in their surrender to the government, with 35 wounded; Villamor Air Base, wherein an assault results in the death of a mutineer and 16 injuries; as well as Sangley Point Naval base and the government-owned PTV-4. In connection with the coup attempt, at least 509 people have been arrested, as reported on Jan. 30 by Armed forces chief Gen. Ramos; 107 soldiers would be convicted by a military court, May 1988.

February
 February 2 – In a national plebiscite for a proposed new constitution, majority votes in favor of it. Drafted by the Constitutional Commission of 1986, it would be adopted with a vote of 76.37% in the referendum for its ratification.
 February 8 – A ceasefire between government troops and the guerrilla forces, began in December 1987, expires.
 February 10 – A clash between 40 communist New People's Army (NPA) rebels and the military forces in Lupao, Nueva Ecija kills 17 villagers and a soldier; wounds an Army radioman. AFP chief Ramos apprehended 85 troops to barracks on Feb. 18 during an investigation.
 February 11:
 Manila Standard publishes its first issue.
 A new constitution is declared ratified, replacing the "freedom constitution."

March
 March 17 – Nineteen army soldiers are killed in a land mine attack perpetrated by Communist rebels in Quezon.
 March 18 – A bomb explosion at the PMA kills four people and injures 43.
 March 20 – Eighteen soldiers are killed when a military patrol is ambushed by the rebels in the southern Phils.

April
 April 18 – A raid in Fort Bonifacio is staged by 56 mutineers trying to free soldiers detained for the failed Jan. 27 coup attempt; 62 people, including military officers, are kept hostage; but is repelled with a rebel soldier killed and two wounded.

May
 May 4 – An ambush by rebels in Malinao, Aklan leaves 16 government soldiers dead and nine wounded.
 May 11 – Legislative elections is held for the first time post-Marcos era.
 May 27 - Geraldine Asis was proclaimed Top 10 in the Miss Universe 1987 pageant night was held in the HarbourFront Centre, Singapore

June
 June 8 – Bernabe Buscayno is wounded in a car ambush in Quezon City wherein a television cameraman is killed.
 June 22 – A convoy carrying former rebel priest Conrado Balweg is ambushed by suspected guerrillas in Licuan-Baay, Abra, killing eight.
 June 26 – Philippine Airlines PR 206 crashes into Mt. Ugo in Itogon, Benguet with all 50 people on board killed. It is then the country's second worst air accident.

July
 July 13 – A plot to take over Manila International Airport (MIA), an international school, and the Air Force headquarters is foiled with four army officers arrested in Manila.
 July 15 – The Cordillera Administrative Region (CAR) is created through Executive Order No. 220 signed by Pres. Corazon Cojuangco–Aquino, consisting of, from Region 1, the provinces of Abra, Benguet and Mountain Province, and Baguio, and from Region 2, the provinces of Kalinga-Apayao and Ifugao.
 July 27 – A renegade colonel, found led two plots against Pres. Aquino, is arrested by the military; coinciding with the beginning of the new Congress' first session.

August
 August 1 – Pres. Marcos' former intelligence chief is charged with plotting to overthrow the Aquino government.
 August 2 – Secretary of the Interior and Local Government Jaime Ferrer is assassinated in Parañaque. Police charges two men regarding the murder, Aug. 25. This is the first assassination of a Cabinet-rank official in country's history.
 August 28–29 – A coup attempt against Pres. Aquino, one of the most serious, is launched by members of the Reform the Armed Forces Movement (RAM) led by Col. Gregorio Honasan; rebel soldiers seize Malacañang Palace, Camp Aguinaldo, Villamor Air Base, three television stations in Metro Manila, military camps in Pampanga and Cebu, and the airport in Legazpi City, wherein assaults result in at least 53 fatalities and more than 200 injuries; is repelled by government troops on the 29th. Honasan is captured in Manila, Dec. 10; while another leader, Lt.Col. Reynaldo Berroya, surrenders, Nov. 27.

September 
 September 2 – Twenty-one of the government troops are killed in an ambush at a village in Quezon. On the same day, ten are killed in a raid in the municipal hall of Gonzaga, Cagayan. Both attacks are perpetrated by the NPA rebels.
 September 5 – Almost one platoon of constabulary forces, later colloquially described as the Lason Batch, fell victims to a mass poisoning attack in Zamboanga in which 19 soldiers died and 140 were hospitalized.
 September 12 – Fighting near Samal, Bataan results in deaths of six soldiers and seven guerrillas.

October
 October 12 – Pres. Aquino files a libel suit against The Philippine Star columnist Luis Beltran for his remarks about her and a mutiny in August. The conviction of Beltran, as well as publisher Maximo Soliven, would be later reversed.
 October 18 – Canonization of San Lorenzo Ruiz, the first Filipino saint.
 October 27 – An explosion and fire in a broadcasting complex in Manila causes two television stations to go off the air.

November

 November 11 – Polytechnic University of the Philippines president Nemesio Prudente is wounded in a gun attack wherein the university attorney, Alex Marteja, is killed. Prudente would be wounded in another attack in June 1988.
 November 15 – Juanito Rivera, CPP's second highest ranking official, arrested in Capas, Tarlac.
 November 25 – Super Typhoon Nina (Sisang) slammed into Luzon, killing 1,063 people and what is believed as the worst typhoon to hit an area in the 20th century.

December

 December 14–15 – 3rd ASEAN Summit was held in Manila, Philippines.
 December 20 – Interisland passenger ferry MV Doña Paz, travelling from Leyte to Manila and said to be overloaded, and oil tanker MT Vector collide at Tablas Strait off Mindoro Island, setting both on fire; 24 survived, death toll later estimated to be 4,386; considered the deadliest peacetime maritime disaster in history.
 December 30 – A regional court orders the release of former colonel Rolando Abadilla, accused in his involvement of two coup attempts against Pres. Aquino, allowing him to run in local elections the following month.

Holidays

As per Executive Order No. 292, chapter 7 section 26, the following are regular holidays and special days to be observed in the country. The order was approved last July 25. Note that in the list, holidays in bold are "regular holidays" and those in italics are "nationwide special days".

 January 1 – New Year's Day
 April 9 – Araw ng Kagitingan (Bataan and Corregidor Day)
 April 16 – Maundy Thursday
 April 17 – Good Friday
 May 1 – Labor Day
 June 12 – Independence Day 
 August 30 – National Heroes Day
 November 1 –  All Saints Day
 November 30 – Bonifacio Day
 December 25 – Christmas Day
 December 30 – Rizal Day
 December 31 – Last Day of the Year

In addition, several other places observe local holidays, such as the foundation of their town. These are also "special days."

Entertainment and culture

 March 1 – ABS-CBN launches the Star Network for the relaunch of Channel 2 after six months and the first white tri-ribbon 2 logo laced with a rhomboidal star came to be.
 March 2 – TV Patrol was launched as its first flagship evening newscast replacing the former flagship national news program Balita Ngayon.

Sports
 June 23 – The Tanduay Rhum Makers win the 1987 PBA Open Conference Finals against the Great Taste Coffee Makers, 134-120
 August 8 – UAAP Games Green Archers was First Won Against Growling Tigers was Score 72–63.
 August 23 – UAAP Games Blue Eagles was First Won Against Green Archers was Score 95-91.
 September 5 – UAAP Games Green Archers was Won Again Against Growling Tigers was Score 68–60 in Green Archers First Won Meeting on UAAP Games.
 September 8 – The Great Taste Coffee Makers win the 1987 PBA All-Filipino Conference Finals against the Hills Bros. Coffee Kings.
 September 26 – UAAP Games Blue Eagles was won Again Against Green Archers was score 98-89 in Blue Eagles First Won Meeting on UAAP Games.
 October 4 – The Ateneo Blue Eagles win the UAAP Season 50 men's basketball championship against the UE Red Warriors, 94–92.
 October 11 – The Letran Knights win the NCAA Season 63 men's basketball championship against the San Sebastian Stags.
 December 13 – The San Miguel Beermen win the 1987 PBA Reinforced Conference Finals against the Hills Bros. Coffee Kings.

Births
 January 16 – Sheena Halili
 January 25 - Japeth Aguilar 
 March 21 – Rocco Nacino
 March 29 – Andi Manzano
 May 15 – Jennylyn Mercado
 May 26 - Bangs Garcia
 June 1 – Johan Santos
 August 23 – Nikki Gil
 August 30 – DJ Chacha
 September 26 - Maricris Garcia
 September 29 - Max Eigenmann
 September 30 – Denise Laurel
 October 1 – Tom Rodriguez
 October 10 – Rodjun Cruz
 October 17
 Bea Alonzo
 Vincent Arboleda (d. 2021)
 October 22 - Jade Lopez
 October 30 – Kevin Belingon, mixed martial artist and former MMA World Champion
 December 21 – Ryza Cenon
 December 25 – LJ Reyes
 December 25 - Bettina Carlos
 December 30 - Jake Cuenca

Deaths
 February 27 – Jose W. Diokno, nationalist and human rights advocate, aged 65.
 May 3 – Roberto Concepcion
 August 2 – Jaime Ferrer, Local Government Minister, aged 70.
 August 5 – Lorenzo Mabini, vice-mayor of Bangui, Ilocos Norte.
 August 24 – Jose Caballero
 August 27 – Dindo Fernando
 August 31 – Vic Silayan
 September 19 – Leandro Alejandro, left wing leader and oppositionist, aged 27.
 October 27 – Joel Alano
 December 7 – Jaime Ongpin
 December 20 – Ruben Ecleo Sr., founder of the Philippine Benevolent Missionaries Association, Inc. and mayor of Dinagat, Surigao del Norte since 1963.

See also
 1986–1987 Philippine coup attempts
 Philippines

References